Ann-Kristine Johansson, born 1962, is a Swedish social democratic politician who has been a member of the Riksdag since 1994.

External links
Ann-Kristine Johansson at the Riksdag website

Members of the Riksdag from the Social Democrats
Living people
1962 births
Women members of the Riksdag
Members of the Riksdag 2002–2006
21st-century Swedish women politicians